The Dublin University by-election was a Parliamentary by-election held on 28 February-5 March 1903. The constituency returned one Member of Parliament (MP) to the House of Commons of the United Kingdom, elected by the first past the post voting system.

The seat had become vacant following the resignation of the incumbent Liberal Unionist MP, W. E. H. Lecky due to ill health. Lecky vacated his Parliamentary seat by being appointed Steward of the Chiltern Hundreds on 18 February 1903. Lecky had been Member of Parliament for the constituency since an 1895 by-election.

Candidates
Janes Henry Mussen Campbell was the Solicitor-General for Ireland, a post he had held since 1901. He had been made an Irish Queen's Counsel in 1892, and in February 1902 was elected a Bencher of Gray's Inn. 

He had been elected Irish Unionist MP for the Dublin seat of St. Stephen's Green in an 1898 by-election but lost the seat at the 1900 general election.

Arthur Warren Samuels was a barrister who had been made a Queen’s Counsel in 1894. He had been called to the Irish Bar in 1877 and the English Bar in 1896.

Both candidates were Unionists.

It was reported that the members of the Irish Bar who had votes supported Campbell over Samuels.

Result

References

1903 elections in the United Kingdom
1903 elections in Ireland
March 1903 events
By-elections to the Parliament of the United Kingdom in Dublin University